Lola B12/60 is a Le Mans prototype built in 2012 by British Lola Racing Cars in England to compete in the FIA World Endurance Championship. It has been entered by the Rebellion Racing team in the FIA Endurance World Championship since the 2012 season and has also been used, to a lesser extent, in the American Le Mans Series (ALMS) championship. It has also been used by the Dyson Racing in the ALMS since 2012.

References 

B12 60
Le Mans Prototypes
24 Hours of Le Mans race cars
Sports prototypes